Kia India Private Limited is a subsidiary of Kia for its operations in India. The company was founded on 19 May 2017 following an announcement of the construction of a new 536-acre manufacturing facility in Anantapur District, Andhra Pradesh. The plant started its trial production in January 2019 and the mass production of its first product, the Kia Seltos started on 31 July 2019. The  billion manufacturing plant is capable of producing 300,000 vehicles annually.

Products 
Kia India is producing several models that was developed specifically for the Indian market, namely the SP2i version of the Seltos and the sub-4 metre SUV Sonet. The plant also manufactures the Kia Carnival exclusively for the domestic market. Within less than four years of operations, in December 2022 the company announced that it has achieved a milestone of 600,000 vehicle sales.

Current models

Statistics 

(Source: Kia India IR Library Sales Results)

See also 

 Hyundai Motor India
 Automotive industry in India

References

External links 

 Official website

India
Companies based in Andhra Pradesh
Car manufacturers of India
Vehicle manufacturing companies established in 2017
Indian subsidiaries of foreign companies
2017 establishments in Andhra Pradesh
Indian companies established in 2017
Anantapur, Andhra Pradesh